Sabina Măriuţă (born 4 February 1995 in Iași) is a Romanian former figure skater. She is the 2011 Romanian national champion.

Programs

Competitive highlights

References

External links 

 
 Sabina Mariuta at Tracings

1995 births
Romanian female single skaters
Living people
People from Brossard
Sportspeople from Iași